Route 2 is a major provincial highway in the Canadian province of New Brunswick, carrying the main route of the Trans-Canada Highway in the province. The highway connects with Autoroute 85 at the border with Quebec and Highway 104 at the border with Nova Scotia, as well as with traffic from Interstate 95 in the U.S. state of Maine via the short Route 95 connector. A core route in the National Highway System, Route 2 is a four-lane freeway in its entirety, and directly serves the cities of Edmundston, Fredericton, and Moncton.

A 20-year project to replace the original 1960s-era two-lane Trans-Canada Highway with a four-lane freeway was completed on November 1, 2007.  The final upgrade to Route 2 and Route 95 has extended the continuous freeway network of North America east to New Glasgow, Nova Scotia. Once Autoroute 85 in Quebec is completed, Route 2 will also connect with the freeway networks of Central Canada without passing through the United States.

Route description
 As a provincial portion of the Trans-Canada, the highway's western terminus is at the interprovincial boundary with Quebec 15 km north of Edmundston. It follows the lower section of the Madawaska River valley and enters the Saint John River valley where it passes north of Edmundston, running several kilometres inland from the east bank of the Saint John River, crossing the Rivière Verte as it continues past Saint-Léonard.

At Grand Falls, the highway crosses to the west bank of the river and passes by Perth-Andover, Florenceville, and Hartland.  At Woodstock the Saint John River turns east and the highway continues to parallel the river on a ridge several kilometres inland along the western bank. It passes south of Fredericton and Oromocto before crossing the northeastern edge of CFB Gagetown.

The Saint John River turns south near Jemseg where the highway crosses the river on the Saint John River High Level Crossing and continues east over the Jemseg River using the Jemseg River Bridge.

The highway leaves the river valleys as it continues east across the rolling hills south of Grand Lake and passes by Havelock, River Glade and Salisbury.

The highway passes north and east of Moncton and Dieppe before turning south and passing by Memramcook, Sackville, and Aulac before reaching the eastern terminus at the interprovincial boundary with Nova Scotia at the Missaguash River.

History

Route 2 was once part of an interprovincial "Highway 2" running from Windsor, Ontario to Halifax, Nova Scotia. It was one of the initial routes defined in 1927, running from Quebec as a continuation of Quebec Route 2 via Edmundston, Grand Falls, Woodstock, Fredericton, Saint John and Moncton, After a short crossing of the New Brunswick Panhandle alongside the Madawaska River to Edmundston, Route 2 closely followed the Saint John River all the way to Saint John, crossing three times - from the east to the west at Grand Falls, back to the east at Perth-Andover, and back to the west at Hartland (on the Hartland Covered Bridge). The road on the east side of the river between Edmundston and Grand Falls had just been opened in about 1926; previously travelers had to pass through Maine (US 1, SR 165, and Boundary Road) on the west side. A Route 2A cut the distance between Fredericton and Saint John via a poorer-quality but more direct road, intersecting Route 2 at Oromocto and Westfield. Beyond Saint John, Route 2 went northeast via Sussex to Moncton, and then turned southeast to cross the Nova Scotia border near Aulac and continue as Nova Scotia Trunk 2. The original course through Aulac to the Nova Scotia border is now bypassed, with the old interprovincial bridge over the Missaguash River now demolished. The original route between Quebec and Sussex is now approximately the River Valley Scenic Drive.

When the route of the Trans-Canada Highway was defined in about 1950, it did not follow Route 2 via Saint John between Fredericton and Sussex, but took the more direct Route 9. Through the late 1950s and 1960s, a number of bypasses and realignments, mostly two-lane, were built to improve Route 2 with federal Trans-Canada Highway funds. The first, built in the 1950s, was around Moncton, between southwest of Salisbury and Sackville. The old road through Moncton became Route 2A, then Route 6 in 1965, and is now Route 106.

Next was the bypass around Woodstock. The road from Route 42 (now Route 560) at Jacksonville northeast to Route 2 (now Route 103) at Somerville was Route 2B by the late 1950s; with the 1960 completion of the Hugh John Flemming Bridge, just upstream from the Hartland Covered Bridge, and the extension of Route 2B south from Jacksonville to Route 2 (now Route 165) south of Woodstock, Route 2B became a realignment of Route 2, with old Route 2 through Woodstock becoming Route 2A (renumbered Route 103 in 1965).

The initial bypass of Fredericton was also built in about 1960, including the 1959 Princess Margaret Bridge across the Saint John River, which replaced the Carleton Street Bridge for traffic to Route 8, 9, and Route 10. Traffic remaining on Route 2 to Saint John exited the bypass at what is now exit 7 for Route 7.

Route 2 was moved to be concurrent with the Trans-Canada Highway, absorbing Route 9, in the 1965 renumbering of several New Brunswick highways. The old alignment via Saint John, where it did not become Route 7 (which replaced Route 2A) or an extension of Route 1, was renumbered as the new Route 102 between Oromocto and Westfield.

The majority of road development in New Brunswick follows settlement patterns which pre-dated motor transport, thus most communities developed along navigable waterways or were served by railways. The development of controlled access expressways only began in the 1960s and only around the largest communities. The majority of early provincial highway improvements merely consisted of upgrading local roads.

Route 2 initially followed present-day Route 144 from the N.B.-Quebec interprovincial boundary to Edmundston and down the Saint John River Valley to Grand Falls. There, it crossed to the west bank of the Saint John River, and continued south to Florenceville where it crossed to the east bank to continue along present-day Route 105 to Hartland, then recrossed the river to the west bank which it followed present-day Routes 103, 165, and 102 to Fredericton in a southeast direction.

At Fredericton a controlled-access 4-lane section was built around the city, and the highway crossed the Saint John River on the Princess Margaret Bridge to the east bank just south of the central business district. Following the river's east bank just metres above its water level (frequently flooded in spring freshets), the route continued south to Jemseg where the highway turned east along the southeast shore of Grand Lake to Youngs Cove Road where the highway turned south to Coles Island and on to Sussex.

At Sussex the highway turned east again and passed by Petitcodiac and then by Salisbury. East of Salisbury, Route 2 followed local roads over a series of low hills north of Moncton, cresting at Lutes Mountain, before descending and following a controlled access section bypassing the city and Dieppe, skirting the edge of the Memramcook River valley and on to Sackville, then Aulac, and finally the N.B.-N.S. inter-provincial boundary.

Four-lane construction
From the early upgrades of these local roads in the 1960s under Trans-Canada Highway funding (which became designated Route 2) until the mid-1980s, very little was done to improve New Brunswick highways (aside from some re-alignment of Route 2 west of Fredericton with the flooding created by the Mactaquac Dam construction in 1968), leading to significant deterioration of the Trans-Canada Highway in New Brunswick. By the mid-1980s Route 2 was a significant traffic hazard and a major embarrassment to the province.

The provincial government changed in 1987 with the election of Premier Frank McKenna who was focused on improving the province's business climate. One of the government's major tasks was to revamp provincial transportation infrastructure and McKenna entered into aggressive negotiations with the federal government of prime minister Brian Mulroney to secure federal funding of new highway projects. McKenna viewed Route 2 (the Trans-Canada Highway) and Route 1 in New Brunswick as being partially a federal responsibility since they funnelled the majority of Atlantic Canada's highway traffic to the U.S. and central Canada. The signing of the Canada-U.S. Free Trade Agreement in 1989, coupled with federal approval for numerous railway line abandonments in the Maritimes during the 1980s, led to predictions of further highway traffic growth on New Brunswick highways in the 1990s.

Under the remainder of the McKenna administration's years of power (until 1997), Route 2 saw significant upgrading to become a 4-lane expressway on heavily-travelled portions of the highway between the N.B.-N.S. inter-provincial boundary and Penobsquis (east of Sussex). Other isolated sections were also upgraded south of Grand Lake and between Edmundston and St. Leonard, as well as at Woodstock where an interchange connected to Interstate 95.

Major re-alignments

Despite the upgrades, the uncontrolled-access sections of Route 2 were still a significant traffic hazard. Intensive lobbying from other provincial governments in the Atlantic provinces, as well as various trucking companies and business and transportation interests, asked that Route 2 be further upgraded. Unfortunately provincial finances could not handle the relatively large price tag required, even with the federal funding at the time.

Fredericton–Moncton Highway
As a result, the final years of the McKenna administration saw a significant realignment of Route 2 proposed, running from Longs Creek, west of Fredericton, bypassing it and Oromocto to the west, and continuing southeast to Jemseg, where it would cross the Saint John River and connect with an existing four-lane section south of Grand Lake. From there the highway would again depart from its original alignment (which headed south to Sussex) and instead head due east to meet the existing Route 2 alignment at River Glade, east of Petitcodiac.

 of new, four-lane, controlled-access expressway would be privately financed and built, with the builder charging tolls for a 25-year period before the provincial government would gain control of the highway. In the late 1990s, an agreement was signed with a private consortium called Maritime Road Development Corporation (led by former provincial Liberal leader and former federal Minister of Transport Douglas Young) to build the new Route 2 alignment at an estimated cost of $1 billion (CAD).

The toll issue was not without controversy as it, along with several other issues, led to the downfall of McKenna's successor, Camille Thériault, in 1999 to PC leader Bernard Lord. The highway was built, but tolls were removed from most portions of the highway before they opened. This portion of the privately built realignment of the Trans-Canada Highway has a hidden toll calculated by sensors in the pavement.  The toll is instead charged to the provincial government, thus motorists do not directly pay for their highway usage.  Along with a payment worth millions of dollars to get out of the original contract, the provincial government now makes all provincial taxpayers cover the cost of the highway when the original plan had been for a user-pay system under a toll structure.

Other re-designations included a  section between Youngs Cove and Sussex which became part of Route 10, a  section between Youngs Cove and Fredericton became part of Route 105, and  section across the Princess Margaret Bridge and Fredericton bypass became part of Route 8.

The re-alignment and construction of Route 2 between Longs Creek and River Glade catapulted New Brunswick highways forward by decades virtually overnight.  The road was designed with  medians, extensive wildlife fencing and underpasses, rumble strips along emergency breakdown lanes, paved emergency U-turn areas, sensors beneath the asphalt for monitoring truck weights as well as local weather and road surface conditions, extensive guard rails and reflectors, as well as two major bridges: the Saint John River High Level Crossing and the nearby Jemseg River Bridge.

Suddenly it was now possible to travel from Fredericton into Nova Scotia (and on to Halifax or New Glasgow) completely on a four-lane controlled access highway.

The Fredericton-Moncton section was officially opened to traffic at 10am on October 24, 2001, five weeks ahead of schedule.

Fredericton––Grand Falls
The high quality of construction of the new Route 2 alignment and improvement in the provincial highway system was not unnoticed by the new government of premier Bernard Lord. Throughout 2000–2003, several small four-lane controlled access sections on Route 2 between Fredericton and Edmundston were opened, most requiring construction of a new alignment.

During this same period, negotiations were undertaken with the federal government to secure funding to complete the last, and one of the most costly parts of the new construction—a  gap between Woodstock and Grand Falls over the Appalachian Mountains (bypassing present-day Routes 165, 103 and 130), and a  gap between Longs Creek and Pokiok (bypassing present-day Route 102), west of Fredericton.

In August, 2003 a joint announcement was made by Premier Lord and Prime Minister Jean Chrétien for a $400 million (CAD) agreement to complete upgrades to the last remaining non-controlled access section of Route 2.

The Pokiok-Longs Creek section had been independently contracted by the provincial government and opened in November 2006. However, the provincial government sought to construct the remaining  gap as part of a complete "design-build-finance-operate-maintain-rehabilitate" plan which would see large private sector consortia bid for the right to design and construct the 98 km of new highway for Route 2, as well as to operate the entire  section of Route 2 between Longs Creek, where it abuts the  hidden-toll highway section built and operated by Maritime Road Development Corporation, and the Quebec–New Brunswick border as well as all of Route 95.

The winning consortium was Brun-Way Group, a joint venture by Atcon Construction and SNC-Lavalin.  Brun-Way Group has two subsidiaries, Brun-Way Construction Inc., which received the ~$540 million to complete the 98 km of new construction as well as selected upgrades to other sections of Route 2 between Longs Creek and the Quebec border, and Brun-Way Highway Operations Inc., which will receive an annual payment from the government of New Brunswick until 2033 to operate and maintain this section of the highway. This agreement will place fully 85% of the maintenance of Route 2 and 100% of Route 95 in the hands of the consortia Brun-Way and MRDC.

The construction of the last segment of four-lane Route 2 was completed by Brun-Way on November 1, 2007. This construction saw a completely new alignment built north of Woodstock, staying several kilometres inland from the Saint John River's west bank, and paralleling the Canada–United States border north to Grand Falls, where it crosses to the east bank of the river and connects with existing four-lane upgrades to Route 2 through to the Quebec boundary. In addition to upgrades to Route 2, Brun-Way is also contracted to perform similar upgrades to Route 95, a short connecting route between the Trans-Canada Highway at Woodstock and the Canada U.S. border at Houlton where it meets Interstate 95.

Upon the opening of this section to traffic on November 1, 2007, the entire length of Route 2 and Route 95 are four-lane controlled-access freeways with a posted speed limit of 110 km/h (70 mph) and a design speed of up to 120 km/h (75 mph).

Highway of Heroes
On August 12, 2012 Highway 2 was officially named "Highway of Heroes" by Premier David Alward.

Exit list

See also
List of New Brunswick provincial highways

References

002
New Brunswick 002
Route 002
002
002
002
002
002
002
002
002
Grand Falls, New Brunswick
Sackville, New Brunswick
Transport in Dieppe, New Brunswick
Transport in Edmundston
Transport in Fredericton
Transport in Moncton
Woodstock, New Brunswick